Imnaha is an unincorporated community at the confluence of Big Sheep Creek and the Imnaha River in Wallowa County, Oregon, United States. Oregon Route 350 connects Imnaha to the nearest incorporated city, Joseph,  to the west. Imnaha is best known as the gateway to the Hat Point scenic lookout on Hells Canyon at the Snake River.

The name Imnaha means "land ruled over by Imna"; Imna was a local Native American subchief. The post office in Imnaha opened January 4, 1885, but the townsite was not established until 1901; it was platted in 1902.

Imnaha is the easternmost settlement in the state of Oregon.

Climate
This region experiences extremely hot and dry summers. According to the Köppen Climate Classification system, Imnaha has a warm-summer Mediterranean climate, abbreviated "Csb" on climate maps.

Notable person
 Eugene Pallette, actor of the silent films era who became a character actor following the transition to talking pictures

References

External links 

 
 

Unincorporated communities in Wallowa County, Oregon
1885 establishments in Oregon
Populated places established in 1885
Unincorporated communities in Oregon